Biston bengaliaria is a moth of the family Geometridae. It is found in China (Yunnan, Tibet), India, Bengal and Thailand.

References

Moths described in 1858
Bistonini